Jaren Lewison (born December 9, 2000) is an American actor who is best known for portraying Ben Gross in the television series Never Have I Ever.

Early life and education 
Jaren Miles Lewison grew up in Dallas, Texas, in a Jewish family. He has one sister named Mikayla.

For 14 years he attended Levine Academy, a Conservative Jewish day school in Dallas where his mother taught kindergarten. He graduated in 2019 from Pearce High School in Richardson, Texas. In high school, he was captain of the varsity football team and was a varsity powerlifter. He also did theater. As a senior, he portrayed William Shakespeare in his school's adaptation of the 1998 film Shakespeare in Love. The  production was chosen to perform at the 2019 International Thespian Festival.

In 2019, Lewison began attending college at the University of Southern California, where he graduated in 2022 with a bachelor's degree in psychology with minors in forensics and criminology. He filmed Never Have I Ever while being a full-time student at USC.

Acting career 
Lewison began acting at five years old, when his after-care had a theater group who connected him with representation. After giving his name to a Dallas film and TV agent, he got his first role as Joshua on Barney & Friends, whom he played in various episodes and videos from 2008 to 2011. He has acted in various TV series and TV movies. He also played the younger version of the main character Hoagie, whom Ed Helms portrayed, in the 2018 comedy film Tag.

His largest role to date was on the main cast as Ben Gross in Lang Fisher and Mindy Kaling's Netflix show, Never Have I Ever.

Filmography

Television

Film

References

External links
 

People from Dallas
Jewish American male actors
University of Southern California alumni
American male child actors
American male film actors
American male television actors
Living people
2000 births
21st-century American Jews